Strand Church is a parish church of the Church of Norway in Strand Municipality in Rogaland county, Norway. It is located in the village of Tau. It is the church for the Strand parish which is part of the Ryfylke prosti (deanery) in the Diocese of Stavanger. The white, wooden church was built in a long church design in 1874 using designs by the architect Fritz von der Lippe. The church seats about 284 people.

History
The earliest existing historical records of the church date back to the year 1280, but the church was not new that year. The church was probably a stave church, possibly from the 12th century. In 1626, the old church was torn down and replaced with a new timber-framed building on roughly the same location. The new church was not fully completed until 1635.

In 1814, this church served as an election church. Together with more than 300 other parish churches across Norway, it was a polling station for elections to the 1814 Norwegian Constituent Assembly which wrote the Constitution of Norway. This was Norway's first national elections. Each church parish was a constituency that elected people called "electors" who later met together in each county to elect the representatives for the assembly that was to meet in Eidsvoll later that year.

In 1874, a new church was built immediately to the north of the old church. After the new church was completed, the old church was torn down.

See also
List of churches in Rogaland

References

Strand, Norway
Churches in Rogaland
Wooden churches in Norway
19th-century Church of Norway church buildings
Churches completed in 1874
12th-century establishments in Norway
Norwegian election church